Komandoo Code c-13 is one of the inhabited islands of the Shaviyani Atoll administrative division and geographically part of the North Miladhummadulhu Atoll in the Maldives.

History
Early citizens lived in komandoo are from shaviyani atoll Mathi komandoo and Keekimini. There is no such proof but in both the island there are ruins of old houses and wells. It is said that Komandoo people firstly lived in Keekimini but to get rid of invaders they moved to Mathi komandoo. Then from Mathi komandoo to Komandoo. There are few historical artifacts and grave stones that shows skills of komandoo people.

Geography
Komandoo is one of the islands of Shaviyanil Atoll.

Demography

It is the second most populated island in Shaviyani Atoll with a current population of about 1,900 people.

Services

Education
Shaviyani Atoll Education Centre is the biggest school in the atoll. Students can join at grade 1 at the age of 7 years and complete their A’ Levels at the end of their 12th grade at this school. Those students doing A’ Levels can complete Commerce and science stream for their studies at Shaviyani Atoll Education Centre. The biggest Teacher Training Center is in Komandoo.

Healthcare
Services provided by the Health Center  include blood transfusion, E.C.G, laboratory investigations and family planning.

Other services
Other services available in Komandoo include speed boat rental services, Wireless internet connection, and cable TV service.

Community
Komandoo is one of the special islands in the Maldives. There are 3 community associations including PSA(Past Students Association), AKYD(Komandoo Youth Development Association) and  KMG(Komandoo Fishermens Association). They have special things uncommon to  other islands. Konmandoo have their own facilities including electricity, TV.station, desalination water plant, FM radio, slipway and their own phone network.

References

Administrative atolls of the Maldives
Islands of the Maldives